Corbin Sinclair Bryant (born January 4, 1988) is a former American football nose tackle. He played college football at Northwestern and was signed by the Chicago Bears as an undrafted free agent in 2011. He has also played for the Pittsburgh Steelers and Buffalo Bills.

College career
Bryant was selected and participated in 2011 NFL Players Association All-Star game. He was named as an all-conference honorable mention.

Professional career

Chicago Bears
On July 26, 2011, Bryant signed with the Chicago Bears as an undrafted free agent.

Pittsburgh Steelers
On September 4, 2011, Bryant signed with the Pittsburgh Steelers to join the practice squad.

Buffalo Bills
On December 31, 2012, Bryant signed with the Buffalo Bills to a future/reserve contract.

In Week 8 of the 2016 season, Bryant suffered a shoulder injury that kept him out for three games before being placed on injured reserve on November 29, 2016.

New York Giants
On June 8, 2017, Bryant signed with the New York Giants. On August 15, 2017, the Giants placed Bryant on injured reserve after dislocating his elbow. He was released with a settlement on November 16, 2017.

References

External links
Northwestern bio
Pittsburgh Steelers bio
Buffalo Bills bio

1988 births
Living people
African-American players of American football
Players of American football from Chicago
American football defensive tackles
Northwestern Wildcats football players
Chicago Bears players
Pittsburgh Steelers players
Buffalo Bills players
New York Giants players
21st-century African-American sportspeople
20th-century African-American people